Marc Libbra (born 5 August 1972, in Toulon) is a French former professional footballer, whose previous clubs include Marseille, Norwich City, Toulouse FC and Hibernian.

Libbra scored a memorable goal on his debut for Norwich City, coming off the bench to score against Manchester City in August 2001. Seven days later he scored a late winner away at Wimbledon. However, he was unable to maintain such form and was released by the club shortly after the start of the 2002–03 season.

Since retiring as a player, Libbra has worked as a football pundit for French television.

References

External links

Career information at ex-canaries.co.uk

1972 births
AS Cannes players
En Avant Guingamp players
Expatriate footballers in England
Expatriate footballers in Scotland
FC Istres players
Association football forwards
French expatriate footballers
Hibernian F.C. players
Ligue 1 players
Ligue 2 players
Living people
Livingston F.C. players
Norwich City F.C. players
Olympique de Marseille players
Sportspeople from Toulon
Scottish Premier League players
English Football League players
Toulouse FC players
US Créteil-Lusitanos players
French footballers
French beach soccer players
Footballers from Provence-Alpes-Côte d'Azur